François Joseph de Choiseul, marquis de Stainville (1700–1770) was a diplomat and courtier in the service of the Dukes of Lorraine. 

He took his title from the village of Stainville in Lorraine. 

He was a chief advisor later serving as Ambassador to Britain and France. When the House of Lorraine were ousted from Lorraine during the War of the Polish Succession in the 1730s, he followed them to their new territory of Tuscany.

He married Françoise-Louise de Bassompierre, descended from François de Bassompierre, another nobleman of Lorraine. De Stainville is best known as the father of Étienne François, duc de Choiseul, the French statesmen who served as Chief Minister between 1758 and 1770. François Choisel had chosen to send his eldest son into the French army. Another son served in the Austrian army where he rose to be a General.

References

Bibliography
 
 

1700 births
1770 deaths
People from Lorraine